Canadian singer Justin Bieber has released several albums since his debut in 2009, resulting in three concert tours (all of them worldwide), and numerous TV and award shows performances. He first released an extended play named My World in November 2009. The EP got promoted through 2009, through performances at several award ceremonies and television shows, including the Summer Rush and the Jingle Ball as well through his first promotional tour Urban Behavior Tour. In 2009, Bieber served as the opening act on selected dates of Taylor Swift's Fearless Tour. In March 2010, he released his first studio album My World 2.0 which included his smash hit "Baby". A tour in support of the album began in June 2010 and ended in October 2011 after 127 stops. It was named My World Tour. In February 2011, he released his first documentary theatre movie Never Say Never. The soundtrack to the album was released the same day as the movie. Nine months later he released Under the Mistletoe, his first Christmas album.

In June 2012, he released his second studio album Believe. The album got promoted through several performances including the iHeartRadio MuchMusic Video Awards and the Summertime Ball. The tour in support of the album began in the United States in September 2012 and ended in December 2013 in Australia after 155 concerts. In January 2013, the acoustic version of the album was released. In December 2013, he released his second compilation album Journals. No tour in support of Journals was booked. No promotion was done either.

Three and a half years later, he released his third album, Purpose, in November 2015. The album got promoted through several award show performances including the 2015 MTV Video Music Awards and the American Music Awards. The Purpose World Tour began in Seattle in March 2016. Bieber began to perform in stadiums since the Latin American leg in February 2017. The tour was set to end in Singapore in October 2017 but ended in July instead due to mental and physical exhaustion. According to Pollstar, Purpose World Tour grossed $163.3 million and sold 1,761,642 tickets in 2016 and the 29 shows in 2017 grossed $93.7 million with 1,043,839 tickets sold. Overall, the tour had a total gross of $257 million and 2,805,481 in attendance in 162 shows. In November 2017, it was reported that a 17-year-old British boy planned a terror attack on a Justin Bieber concert in Cardiff, in name of the Islamic State weeks after the Manchester Arena bombing following an Ariana Grande concert, however, nothing fatal happened.

Concert tours 
{| class="wikitable sortable plainrowheaders" style="text-align:center;"
! scope="col" |Title
! scope="col" width="14%" |Dates
! scope="col" |Associated album(s)
! scope="col" |Continent(s)
! scope="col" |Shows
! scope="col" |Gross
! scope="col" |Attendance
! scope="col" width="2%" class="unsortable" |
|-
! scope="row" |My World Tour
| –
October 20, 2011
|My World
My World 2.0
|
|127
|$53,300,000
|808,271
|

|- class="expand-child"
| colspan="8" style="border-bottom-width:3px; padding:5px;" |

|-
! scope="row" |Believe Tour
| –
December 8, 2013
|Believe
|
|155
|$210,000,000
|1,694,897
|

|- class="expand-child"
| colspan="8" style="border-bottom-width:3px; padding:5px;" |

|-
! scope="row" |Purpose World Tour
| –
July 2, 2017
|Purpose
|
|162
|$256,384,056
|2,851,752
|

|- class="expand-child"
| colspan="8" style="border-bottom-width:3px; padding:5px;" |

|-
! scope="row" |Justice World Tour
| –
September 4, 2022
|Changes
Justice
|
|49
|$55,053,785
|431,986
|
|- class="expand-child"
| colspan="8" style="border-bottom-width:3px; padding:5px;" |
{{hidden|headercss=font-size: 100%; width: 95%;|contentcss=width: 95%;|header=Justice World Tour setlist|content=
 "Somebody"
 "Hold On"
 "Deserve You"
 "Holy"
 "Where Are Ü Now"
 "What Do You Mean?"
 "Yummy"
 "Changes" 
 "Love Yourself"
 "Off My Face"
 "Confident"
 "All That Matters"
 "Don't Go" 
 "Sorry"
 "Love You Different"
 "As I Am"
 "Ghost"
 "Lonely"
 "2 Much"
 "Intentions"
 "Boyfriend"
 "Baby"
Encore
 "Peaches"
 "Anyone"
}}
|}

Promotional tours

Live performances

My World era

My World 2.0 era

Under the Mistletoe era

Believe era

Purpose era

Changes era

Justice era

References 

Live performances
Lists of concerts and performances